Rotherhithe was a parliamentary constituency centred on the Rotherhithe district of South London.  It returned one Member of Parliament (MP)  to the House of Commons of the Parliament of the United Kingdom, elected by the first past the post system.

The constituency was created for the 1885 general election, and abolished for the 1950 general election when it became part of the revived Bermondsey constituency.

Boundaries

1885-1918

The Metropolitan Borough of Bermondsey wards of St Olave's, St John's, St Thomas's, St Mary, Rotherhithe and St Mary Magdalen, Bermondsey.

1918-1950
The Metropolitan Borough of Bermondsey wards of St John, St Olave, Bermondsey five and six, and Rotherhithe one, two and three.

Members of Parliament

Election results

Elections in the 1880s

Elections in the 1890s

Elections in the 1900s

Elections in the 1910s

General Election 1914–15:

Another General Election was required to take place before the end of 1915. The political parties had been making preparations for an election to take place and by the July 1914, the following candidates had been selected; 
Liberal: Hubert Carr-Gomm
Unionist:

Election in the 1920s

Election in the 1930s

Election in the 1940s

In fiction
The constituency is portrayed in an episode (A Place in the World) of TV drama series Upstairs, Downstairs as the safe Docklands Labour seat of "Rotherhithe East" that is unsuccessfully contested by James Bellamy for the Conservatives in a by-election in 1920.  Location scenes were actually shot in Rotherhithe in January 1975 during the making of the episode.  (In real life through 1920 Rotherhithe was a Unionist seat.)

References

External links

Parliamentary constituencies in London (historic)
Constituencies of the Parliament of the United Kingdom established in 1885
Constituencies of the Parliament of the United Kingdom disestablished in 1950
Politics of the London Borough of Southwark